The Calcutta Stock Exchange (CSE), located at the Lyons Range, Kolkata, India, is a stock exchange under the ownership of Ministry of Finance, Government of India. It is the second oldest stock exchange in Asia. It was founded on 1 December 1863 by sixteen of Calcutta's leading stockbrokers, beginning its work in rented premises at 11 Strand Road. It was reconstituted in its current form in 1908, and is the second largest bourse in India. The Calcutta Stock Exchange has been asked to exit by SEBI, but the matter is sub judice before the Calcutta High Court; thirteen other regional stock exchanges have closed in the last three years under SEBI's exit policy, including the Bangalore Stock Exchange, the Hyderabad Stock Exchange and the Madras Stock Exchange. Since 2013, there has been no trading on the CSE trading platform.

History
In 1830, bourse activities in Kolkata were conducted under a neem tree. The earliest record of dealings in securities in India records trading of the British East India Company’s loan stock. The exchange was founded on 1 December 1863 by sixteen leading stockbrokers, beginning life in rented premises on 11 Strand Road. The premises also had a library, open to the public, which could be accessed after paying an admission fee. In 1908, the stock exchange was reconstituted in its current form, and had 150 members. The present building at the Lyons Range was constructed in 1928. The Calcutta Stock Exchange Ltd was granted permanent recognition by the Government of India with effect from 14 April 1980, under the relevant provisions of the Securities Contracts (Regulation) Act, 1956. The Calcutta Stock Exchange followed the open outcry system for stock trading until 1997, when it was replaced by C-STAR (CSE Screen Based Trading And Reporting), an electronic trading platform.

The Bombay Stock Exchange (BSE) has made a strategic investment in the Calcutta Stock Exchange, acquiring 5% of its shares.

See also 
 List of South Asian stock exchanges
 List of stock exchanges in the Commonwealth of Nations

References

External links
 

Stock exchanges in India
Companies based in Kolkata
1830 establishments in India